D. C. "Dixie" Wilcutt (March 25, 1923 – October 19, 2015) was an American professional basketball player. Wilcutt was selected in the 1948 BAA draft by the St. Louis Bombers. He played for the Bombers for two seasons. The first year they were in the Basketball Association of America. That league then combined with the National Basketball League to form the modern day National Basketball Association, which Wilcutt then played in for one season before retiring from basketball. He played college basketball for Saint Louis.

Wilcutt soon thereafter became the head boys' basketball coach and athletic director at Christian Brothers College High School in St. Louis, Missouri. He remained there from 1952 to 1987. His teams won 11 sectional championships, three state titles, and Wilcutt became the winningest coach in school history with a career record of 571–332.

Wilcutt died on October 19, 2015.

BAA/NBA career statistics

Regular season

Playoffs

References

External links

1923 births
2015 deaths
American men's basketball players
Basketball players from Alabama
Guards (basketball)
High school basketball coaches in the United States
Saint Louis Billikens men's basketball players
St. Louis Bombers (NBA) draft picks
St. Louis Bombers (NBA) players